Pimelea brachyphylla is a species of flowering plant in the family Thymelaeaceae and is endemic to the south-west of Western Australia. It is an erect to spreading shrub with linear to elliptic leaves and clusters of white, tube-shaped flowers.

Description
The inflorescence are upright,  flowers are bisexual or female, white and smooth on the inside. Flowering occurs from June to October.

Taxonomy
Pimelea brachyphylla was first formally described in 1873 by George Bentham in Flora Australiensis. The specific epithet (brachyphylla) means "short-leaved".

Distribution and habitat
This pimelea grows in mallee woodland or shrubland from near Wagin to Israelite Bay in the Avon Wheatbelt, Coolgardie, Esperance Plains, Jarrah Forest and Mallee bioregions of south-western Western Australia.

Conservation status
Pimelea brachyphylla is listed as "not threatened" by the Government of Western Australia Department of Biodiversity, Conservation and Attractions.

References

brachyphylla
Taxa named by George Bentham
Plants described in 1873
Flora of Western Australia